Coppa Italia Serie C, formerly named Coppa Italia Lega Pro, is a straight knock-out based competition involving teams from Serie C in Italian football first held in 1972.

Format
There are a total of six rounds in the competition. It begins in August with the first set, which is contested by 56 out of 60 teams. The other four clubs, which also play in Coppa Italia, join in during the second set.
Each game is played as a single leg, except for the semi-finals and the final. If teams are tied (after single leg or on aggregate, no away goal rule applies), the winner is decided by extra-time and a penalty shootout if required. 

As well as being presented with the trophy, the winning team also qualifies for the following edition of Coppa Italia and for the third round of Serie C promotion play-offs. If the winners:
 are already promoted to Serie B via finishing in the top of the league;
 have already qualified for the third round or the quarter-finals via finishing in the 3rd or the 2nd position respectively;
 have qualified for the relegation play-outs;
 are relegated to Serie D;
 or just renounce;
their spot goes to the runners-up or, subordinately, to the 4th-placed team playing in the same group as the winners.

Past winners

Coppa Italia Serie C

Coppa Italia Lega Pro

Coppa Italia Serie C

See also
 Football in Italy
 Lega Pro

References

External links
  Coppa Italia Serie C at RSSSF

 
3
Cup
Recurring sporting events established in 1972
1972 establishments in Italy